St. Peter and St. Paul Orthodox Church in Burr Ridge, Illinois, is a parish of the Orthodox Church in America Diocese of the Midwest in the Chicago metropolitan area.

History 

On August 3, 1931, Rev. Peter Semkoff officially petitioned Theophilus, Archbishop of Chicago, the local bishop of the Russian Metropolia, for his permission to establish a new parish in the Gage Park area of Chicago (2410 W 53rd St. Chicago, IL 60632), to be eventually known as St. Peter and St. Paul Carpatho-Russian Orthodox Greek Catholic Church. The first membership meeting was held on September 30, 1931, and on December 1, 1931, property for a new church was purchased on the northwest corner of Western Ave. and 53rd St. The first liturgy in the new church was celebrated on Palm Sunday, April 20, 1932. The majority of parish founders were Carpatho-Russians formerly belonging to St. Mary's Greek Catholic Church under papal jurisdiction. The desire to control parish property and retain what was then perceived as nasa Ruska Vira ("our Russian Faith") were primary reasons for affiliating with the Metropolia.

After being spiritually served for over 50 years by V. Rev. Peter Semkoff and his son, V. Rev. Nicholas Semkoff, this once tight-knit ethnic enclave of southwest side Chicago parishioners vacated their original temple and continued their parish life in a new church on County Line Rd. in Burr Ridge, Illinois. The new location was determined by the demographics of the parish members, who now reside as far north as Racine, Wisconsin, and as far south as Bourbonnais, IL. The first service in the new church was held on February 15, 1998.

The parish now serves an English-speaking congregation representing many ethnic roots.

Sources
This article incorporates text from an article of the same name on orthodoxwiki.org, which see for attribution history. Orthodoxwiki is licensed under GFDL.

Eastern Orthodox churches in Illinois
Orthodox Church in America churches
Christian organizations established in 1931
Churches completed in 1932
Russian-American culture in Illinois
Rusyn-American culture in Illinois
20th-century Eastern Orthodox church buildings